Biclonuncaria is a genus of moths belonging to the family Tortricidae.

Species
Biclonuncaria alota  Razowski & Becker, 1993
Biclonuncaria cerucha  Razowski & Becker, 1993
Biclonuncaria coniata  Razowski & Becker, 1993
Biclonuncaria conica  Razowski & Becker, 1993
Biclonuncaria dalbergiae  Razowski & Becker, 1993
Biclonuncaria deutera  Razowski & Becker, 1993
Biclonuncaria foeda  Razowski & Becker, 1993
Biclonuncaria juanita  Razowski & Becker, 1993
Biclonuncaria parvuncus Razowski & Becker, 2011
Biclonuncaria phaedroptera  Razowski & Becker, 1993
Biclonuncaria residua  Razowski & Becker, 1993
Biclonuncaria tetrica  Razowski & Becker, 1993

References

 , 2005: World Catalogue of Insects volume 5 Tortricidae.
 , 1993, Revista brasil. Ent. 37: 507.
 , 2011: Systematic and faunistic data on Neotropical Tortricidae: Phricanthini, Tortricini, Atteriini, Polyorthini, Chlidanotini (Lepidoptera: Tortricidae). Shilap Revista de Lepidopterologia 39 (154): 161-181.

External links
tortricidae.com

Polyorthini
Tortricidae genera
Taxa named by Józef Razowski